Amanda Sofia Svensson (born 5 June 1987 in Arlöv) is a Swedish author. She is the daughter of journalist Per Svensson and his wife Ann-Sofie Svensson, she grew up in Malmö. She started writing at a young age and at seventeen she reached the final of Lilla Augustpriset. She got her education at writing at Fridhems folkhögskola in Svalöv between 2006 and 2008. And studied from 2011 literature science and French at Lunds University.

Amanda Svensson debuted as an author in 2008 in the published Hey Dolly. Her second book Välkommen till den här världen was nominated to Augustpriset in 2011.

Om 17 August 2012, Svensson presented an episode of the Sveriges Radio show Sommar i P1.

Bibliography 
2008 – Hey Dolly , Norstedts 
2011 – Välkommen till den här världen
2014 – Allt det där jag sa till dig var sant

References

Living people
1987 births
Swedish women writers
People from Burlöv Municipality